Reuben Tam (January 17, 1916 – January 3, 1991) was an American landscape painter, educator, poet and graphic artist.

Early life and education 
He was born in Kapa'a on the Hawaiian island of Kaua'i. He earned a BA degree from the University of Hawaii in 1937. He attended graduate classes in 1940 at California School of Fine Art (now known as San Francisco Art Institute). In 1941 he moved to New York City and he continued his studies from 1942 until 1945 at Columbia University with Meyer Schapiro.

Career 
Tam became affiliated with the Downtown Gallery in 1945. Tam is best known for his referential abstract landscape paintings showing both land and sea, such as From Cliffs to Evening. In his later career he worked more in pure abstraction.

From 1946 to the 1974, he taught at the Brooklyn Museum Art School (BMAS). Some of his notable students from BMAS included Frances Kornbluth, Mel Tanner, Jean Arcoleo, Pat Adams, and Richard Mayhew. He spent many summers painting on Monhegan Island in Maine, starting around 1950. He later taught courses at Queens College and Oregon State University.

Death and legacy 
Tam returned to Kaua'i in 1980, and died there on January 3, 1991, of lymphoma.

The Addison Gallery of American Art (Andover, Massachusetts), the Brooklyn Museum of Art (Brooklyn, New York ), the Butler Institute of American Art (Youngstown, Ohio), the Corcoran Gallery (Washington D. C.),  Des Moines Art Center (Des Moines, Iowa), Farnsworth Art Museum (Rockland, Maine), Fisher Gallery (University of Southern California, Los Angeles), the Hawaii State Art Museum, the Henry Art Gallery (University of Washington, Seattle), the Hirshhorn Museum and Sculpture Garden (Washington, D.C.), the Honolulu Museum of Art, the Lowe Art Museum (University of Miami), the Metropolitan Museum of Art, the Museum of Modern Art (New York City), the Mildred Lane Kemper Art Museum (Washington University in St. Louis), the National Academy of Design (New York City), the Newark Museum (Newark, New Jersey), Reading Public Museum (Reading, Pennsylvania), the San Diego Museum of Art (San Diego, California), Sheldon Memorial Art Gallery (Lincoln, Nebraska), the Smithsonian American Art Museum (Washington, D. C.), the University of Michigan Museum of Art (Ann Arbor, Michigan) and the Whitney Museum of American Art (New York City) are among the public collections holding works by Reuben Tam.

Awards and honors 
 1940 – First National Prize for his painting Koto Crater at the Golden Gate International Exposition (GGIE)
1948 – Guggenheim Fellowship
1975 – Associate National Academician (ANA), National Academy of Design
1978 – American Academy and Institute of Arts and Letters, Award in Art
1987 – National Academicians (NA), National Academy of Design
1989 – Elliot Cades Literary Award for his poetry, from University of Hawaii

References

Further reading
 Chang, Gordon H., Mark Dean Johnson, Paul J. Karlstrom & Sharon Spain, Asian American Art, a History, 1850-1970, Stanford University Press, pp. 429–430
 
 
 
 Hartwell, Patricia L. (editor), Retrospective 1967-1987, Hawaii State Foundation on Culture and the Arts, Honolulu, Hawaii, 1987, p. 57
 Johnston, Healoha, "Islanding: Reuben Tam", Honolulu Museum of Art, June • July • Aug 2018, p. 5
 
 
 
 

1916 births
1991 deaths
20th-century American painters
American male painters
People from Kauai County, Hawaii
Printmakers from Hawaii
20th-century American printmakers
National Academy of Design members
University of Hawaiʻi alumni
San Francisco Art Institute alumni
Columbia University School of the Arts alumni
Brooklyn Museum Art School faculty
20th-century American male artists